"Suddenly" is a song by Iranian-Swedish Persian pop singer Arash for his second album Donya. Featuring the Swedish singer Rebecca Zadig. It was released by Warner Music Sweden on June 19, 2008 becoming a summer hit in Sweden.

Content
The song is Bilingual. The main verses are sang by Arash in Persian and the chorus in English by Rebecca Zadig and contains a sample of Algerian classic Abdel Kader.

A second version retitled "Près de toi" (near you) released one year later, featuring the French-Algerian raï singer Najim and also Rebecca becoming trilingual French/Persian/English

Charts

Weekly charts

References

2008 songs
Arash (singer) songs
Songs written by Robert Uhlmann (composer)
Songs written by Arash (singer)